Theodore Victor Olsen (April 25, 1932 in Rhinelander, Wisconsin – July 13, 1993 in Rhinelander) was an American western fiction author. The films The Stalking Moon and Soldier Blue were based on his works.

Biography
Olsen's family migrated from Norway in 1901.  Theodore Olsen was born on April 25, 1932 in Rhinelander, Wisconsin. He went to school in Rhinelander and began to write in high school.  He began a Western novel at that time. He went to college in Stevens Point, Wisconsin.

Olsen finally finished his novel, Haven of the Hunted, and it was published in 1956. He also began to sell Western stories to pulp magazines at this time. Though he occasionally traveled west, he lived his whole life in Rhinelander and used exhaustive research to help accurately portray scenes of the West in his stories.

Olsen was married to fellow fiction author Beverly Butler.

Olsen died in Rhinelander on July 13, 1993, and several works were published posthumously.

Much of Olsen's family still lives in the Rhinelander region. They own a  ranch with a century-old farm house and dairy barn.

Bibliography

Novels
Western
 Haven of the Hunted, Ace Books 1956, new ed. Chivers Press 6/2000, 
 The Man from Nowhere, Ace 1959, new ed. Chivers 3/1992, 
 McGivern, Gold Medal Books 1960, new ed. Thorndike Press 4/2001, 
 High Lawless, Fawcett 1960, new ed. Sagebush Westerns 7/2010, 
 Gunswift, Fawcett Books 1960, new ed. Center Point Print 7/2006, 
 Brand of the Star, Fawcett Gold Medal 1961, new ed. Thorndike 4/2011, 
 Ramrod Rider, Fawcett Gold Medal 1961, new ed. Center Point 9/2005, 
 Savage Sierra, Gold Medal 1963, new ed. Thorndike 3/1998, 
 A Man Called Brazos, Fawcett Gold Medal 1964, new ed. Gunsmoke Westerns 8/2005, 
 Canyon of the Gun, Fawcett Gold Medal 1965, new ed. Gunsmoke 9/2007, 
 The Stalking Moon, Doubleday (publisher) 1965, new ed. Leisure Books 5/2010, 
 The Hard Men, Star Weekly Novel 1966, new ed. Gunsmoke 7/2001, 
 Blizzard Pass, Fawcett 1/1968, new ed. Thorndike 10/2004, 
 Soldier Blue a.k.a. Arrow in the Sun, Star Weekly 1970, new ed. Thorndike 
 The Burning Sky, Star Weekly 1/1971, new ed. Chivers 5/1998, 
 A Man Named Yuma, Gold Medal 1/1971, new ed. Chivers 3/2011, 
 Bitter Grass, Sphere Books 4/1971, 
 There Was a Season, Doubleday 1972
 Summer of the Drums, Doubleday 1972
 
 Mission to the West, Ace 1/1973, new ed. Leisure 9/1997, 
 Eye of the Wolf, Sphere 3/1973, 
 Run to the Mountain, Fawcett Gold Medal 1/1974, new ed. Gunsmoke 11/2008, 
 Starbuck's Brand, Belmont Tower 1974, new ed. Leisure 11/1997, 
 Day of the Buzzard, Fawcett Gold Medal 1/1976, new ed. Gunsmoke 1/2009, 
 Westward They Rode, Ace 1/1976, new ed. Leisure 7/1996, 
 Track the Man Down, Manor Books 1976, new ed. Leisure 10/1998,   
 Bonner's Stallion, Fawcett Gold Medal 1/1977, new ed. Center Point May 2010, 
 Rattlesnake, Doubleday 2/1979, 
 The Lockhart Breed, Walker & Company 3/1982, 
 Red is the River, Fawcett 1/1983, 
 Lazlo's Strike, Doubleday 1/1983, new ed. Gunsmoke 2/2010, 
 Blood of the Breed, Ulverscroft Print 1/1985, 
 Lonesome Gun, Fawcett 10/1985, 
 Blood Rage, Ballantine Books 6/1987, 
 A Killer is Waiting, Fawcett 2/1988, 
 Break the Young Land, Avon Books 1988, new ed. Center Point 9/2004, 
 Under the Gun, Fawcett 9/1989, 
 Keno, Chivers 4/1991, 
 The Golden Chance, Fawcett 9/1992, 
 Deadly Pursuit, Thorndike 8/1995, sequel to Golden Chance
 Treasures of the Sun, Five Star Publishing Westerns 11/1998,  
 The Lost Colony, Five Star 9/1999, 
 The Vanishing Herd, Five Star 5/2001, 

Other Novels
 Brothers of the Sword, Berkley Books 1962 (Vikings)

Anthologies
 War Whoop and Battle Cry, collection of stories together with Clifton Adams, Clay Fisher and Luke Short, edited by Brian Garfield, Scholastic Corporation 1/1968
 Lone Hand (Frontier Stories), Thorndike 6/1998, 
 Man without a Past (Frontier Stories), Five Star 11/2001,

Non-fiction
Rhinelander Country series
 Roots of the North, Pineview Publishing 1979
 Birth of a City, Pineview 1983, 
 Our First Hundred Years, Pineview 1983

Filmography
 The Stalking Moon, 1968 directed by Robert Mulligan, with Gregory Peck and Eva Marie Saint
 Soldier Blue, 1970 directed by Ralph Nelson, with Peter Strauss and Candice Bergen

Awards
 1992: Golden Spur Award in the category Paperback Original for Golden Chance

References

External links 
 http://www.fantasticfiction.co.uk/o/t-v-olsen/

Western (genre) writers
20th-century American novelists
American male novelists
1932 births
1993 deaths
People from Rhinelander, Wisconsin
American male short story writers
20th-century American short story writers
Novelists from Wisconsin
20th-century American male writers